Julie E. Clark (born June 27, 1948) is a retired American aerobatic air show aviator and commercial airline pilot. She started her commercial flying career with Golden West Airlines as a first officer and ended it in 2003 as a Northwest Airlines Airbus A320 Captain. She was one of the first female pilots to work for a major airline, and has been voted as "Performer of the Year" several times for her air show performances.

Career 
Clark has more than 50 years of flight experience, 41 years as a solo aerobatic-air show pilot as of October 19, 2019, and 30,000 accident-free hours to her name (34,000 hours as of October 19, 2019). She flew an average of 20 air shows a year in her Juice Plus-sponsored Beechcraft T-34 Mentor, and is rated in more than 66 types of aircraft. She is an enshrined member of the Living Legends of Aviation.

Clark received her pilot certificate in 1969 in San Carlos, California. She performed in the same plane from 1977 until 2019, a T-34 Mentor that she bought for $18,000 in Anchorage, Alaska.  She named the plane Free Spirit, which went to the Hiller Aviation Museum when she retired.

While at the 2019 EAA AirVenture Oshkosh air show, Clark announced her plans to retire, with her last performance on November 7, 2019 at Nellis Air Force Base.

In December 2018, she received the Sword of Excellence from the International Council of Air Shows, and in 2019, the Federal Aviation Administration's Wright Brothers Master Pilot Award.

Family 
Clark's father, Captain Ernest Clark, was also an airline pilot. He was murdered in 1964 by a suicidal passenger on Pacific Air Lines Flight 773. All crew and passengers were killed as a result of the passenger shooting both pilots, then himself, causing the plane to crash. Her mother's death just a year earlier, and her father's subsequent death, increased her determination to fly.

References

External links
 News
 Profiles
 Display
 Julie Clark Airshows
 Julie Clark website archives
 Biography from Airport Journals
 Video of Julie Clark performing in her T-34

1948 births
Living people
Aerobatic pilots
Aviators from California
Commercial aviators
American women commercial aviators
People from Hayward, California
21st-century American women